Casterley Camp is the site of an Iron Age univallate hillfort in Wiltshire, England, about  southwest of the village of Upavon. The site comprises a large Iron Age/Romano-British enclosure, possibly non-defensive in function, and incomplete. It was partially excavated in the 19th century.

Three apparently related enclosures are identified within the site of Casterley Camp. Stock control and religious functions have been attributed to the enclosures. There is also an Iron Age/Romano-British trackway on the west side of the site, with traces of earth banks on both sides. The site is a scheduled monument.

There are public footpaths and bridleways to the north and west of the site. Since 1898, land immediately west and south has been part of the Salisbury Plain firing ranges.

References

See also 
List of hill forts in England



Iron Age sites in England
Buildings and structures in Wiltshire
Hill forts in Wiltshire
Archaeological sites in Wiltshire
Scheduled monuments in Wiltshire